RGC 1404 (Rygbi Gogledd Cymru 1404), formerly "Gogledd Cymru" ("North Wales"), is a rugby union team founded in 2008 and based in Colwyn Bay, Conwy. They currently play in the Welsh Premier Division; after winning Division 1 East at the first attempt in 2012–13, they spent three seasons in the Welsh Championship before earning promotion to the Premier Division in 2015–16. They finished fourth in their first season in the top flight, but also won the WRU Challenge Cup for the first time. They play at Eirias Stadium, which has a capacity of just over 6,000.

History
Although an amateur North Wales rugby representative side had existed for over 50 years, Gogledd Cymru was established by the North Wales Rugby Council, in February 2007, in response to the WRU approved strategic plan for the development of rugby union in the region. This aimed to achieve a north Wales side playing in the Welsh Premier Division by 2010–11 In their first season, Gogledd Cymru reached the final of the Welsh Counties Cup.

2008–2011

In December 2008, it was announced that the Eirias Stadium in Colwyn Bay was to be the home ground for Gogledd Cymru.

In January 2010, the team was renamed RGC 1404:  RGC is an initialism for Rygbi Gogledd Cymru (North Wales Rugby), and 1404 reflects the year that Owain Glyndŵr became Prince of Wales.

2012–2013
For the 2012–13 season, the team were entered into WRU Division One East, playing a full season of games against teams from South East Wales. RGC finished the season at the top of the table, earning promotion to the Welsh Championship for 2013–14.

2013–2014
RGC's first season in the Welsh Championship saw them spend much of the season in second place to a dominant Ebbw Vale only to drop to third in the last game by losing to Cardiff Met 36–24. Several RGC players were selected and played in the Wales side for the 2014 U20 Six Nations, with the home games hosted at RGC's Eirias Stadium.

Players

Current squad
Squad for 2016–17

Notable former players
See :Category:RGC 1404 players
On 6 November 2021, hooker Bradley Roberts became the first former RGC 1404 player to win a senior cap for Wales, though previously both Olly Cracknell and Rhun Williams had been named in senior Wales squads, and James Lang had been capped by Scotland. 

Several other players who played senior rugby for RGC 1404 have gone on to play top level European professional rugby in the Pro 14 or English Premiership, and a number of players have played for Wales at U20 level whilst with RGC.

Coaching staff

Head coaches

Results and statistics

WRU Leagues

Honours
WRU Division One East: 2012–13
WRU National Cup: 2016–17

References

External links
 RGC Website
 North Wales Rugby website
 RGC Supporters Club

Welsh rugby union teams
Sport in Conwy County Borough